WRKS (105.9 FM, "The Zone") is a radio station licensed to Pickens, Mississippi, although its studio is located in Ridgeland, Mississippi. Launched on July 2, 2009, the station's format is sports, with programming from ESPN Radio. WRKS is owned by Alpha Media through licensee Alpha Media Licensee LLC Debtor in Possession.  Along with five other sister stations, its studios are located in Ridgeland, a suburb of Jackson, while the transmitter tower is in Canton.

History
105.9 FM started out in 1980 with the call sign WXMR. (A variety-format, low-powered radio station in Marengo, Illinois has since taken over the WXMR call-letters.) On June 1, 1982, the call sign was changed to WLTD, then to WYJS on December 15, 1995. On January 16, 2004, the call sign was again changed to WOAD-FM with an urban gospel format as "Power 105.9". On July 3, 2009, the urban gospel format was dropped for a sports format as "The Zone" with the call sign again changing to WZNO. It had been owned by Inner City Broadcasting of New York City until its bankruptcy in the early 2010s, at which time YMF Media took over the station. The WRKS callsign had been used for a New York station on 98.7 FM until its owner, Emmis Communications, flipped to an ESPN Radio simulcast and sold the rights to the WRKS name to YMF, which then transferred it to WZNO.

On September 24, 2013, the sale of WRKS and 5 other YMF Media stations to L&L Broadcast Holdings was consummated at a purchase price of $9.4 million. Since July 1, 2014, the station has been owned by Alpha Media, following a three-way merger.

References

External links

RKS
Sports radio stations in the United States
ESPN Radio stations
Radio stations established in 1980
Alpha Media radio stations